Harold J. Robertson (March 4, 1896 – January 7, 1962) was a Canadian-born player and coach of American football. He played one game as a professional football player with the Rochester Jeffersons of the National Football League (NFL) in 1922, and was head football coach at Oglethorpe University from 1924 to 1933.

Biography
A native of Chambly, Quebec, Robertson grew up in Somerville, Massachusetts, and attended Somerville High School and Worcester Academy. In 1914 and 1915, Robertson and his brother Jim Robertson played summer baseball for the Falmouth "Cottage Club" team in what is now the Cape Cod Baseball League. While Jim played first base, Harry was a catcher, and was reportedly a "fast and aggressive" player.

Robertson served in the United States Army during World War I, and played on the football team at Camp Dix in 1918. After his service, Robertson attended Syracuse University, where he played college football as an end, and was team captain. In 1920, Robertson captained his Syracuse squad against his brother Jim, who was captain of the Dartmouth team. Robertson graduated from Syracuse in 1922, and later that year appeared in a single game for the Rochester Jeffersons of the National Football League (NFL), his only game as a professional.

Robertson served as a line coach at Syracuse from 1921 to 1923, and became the head football coach at Oglethorpe University in 1924, succeeding his brother, Jim, who had coached the Oglethorpe team in 1923. At Oglethorpe, Robertson led his team to back-to-back Southern Intercollegiate Athletic Association (SIAA) titles in 1924 and 1925, and his 1926 team posted a landmark upset over William Alexander's Georgia Tech squad, winning by a score of 7 to 6. Robertson led Oglethorpe for ten seasons, and was succeeded by John Patrick following the 1933 season.

Robertson was inducted into the Oglethorpe Athletics Hall of Fame in 1962, and was remembered as "a football genius...lively, prankish and warmhearted." He died in Coral Gables, Florida in 1962 at age 65.

Head coaching record

References

External links
 

1896 births
1962 deaths
American football ends
American football tackles
Canadian players of American football
Cape Cod Baseball League players (pre-modern era)
Falmouth Commodores players
Oglethorpe Stormy Petrels football coaches
Rochester Jeffersons players
Syracuse Orange football coaches
Syracuse Orange football players
People from Chambly, Quebec
Sportspeople from Somerville, Massachusetts
Sportspeople from Quebec
Coaches of American football from Massachusetts
Players of American football from Worcester, Massachusetts